Phoneutria boliviensis is a species of a medically important spider in the family Ctenidae found in Central and South America.

Characteristics 

Male

Males have a varied color. The prosoma, legs and sternum are brown, and the opisthosoma is dark. Males grow from 30 to 35 mm in length.

'''Females

The females are slightly larger, growing up to 30-40 mm in length, with a yellowish to brownish brown prosoma. There are clipped lateral black lines, a thin longitudinal black band and yellow bands dorsally on the pedipalp. The opisthosoma is dorsally yellowish, with a bright yellow-brownish pair of beams. The ventral part the opisthosoma varies from gold to yellow with two sharp brown spots and two white spots. The chelicerae vary from red to reddish-brown. The legs have two small yellow spots dorsally and thin black transverse stripes.

Distribution and Habitat 
Phoneutria boliviensis lives in both Central and South America. In South America it can be seen in Bolivia, Paraguay, Peru, Ecuador, Brazil and Colombia. They are found in habitats associated with dry and humid tropical forests, usually in soil with little waste.

Reproduction 
Females lay up to 4 egg sacks, with 430-1,300 puppies hatching after 28-34 days. Reproductive behavior consists of the male riding on the female, showing a typical copulation position of modern wandering spiders.

References

Ctenidae
Spiders of Central America
Spiders of South America
Spiders described in 1897